Daniel Bennett St. John (October 8, 1808 – February 18, 1890) was a U.S. Representative from New York.

Life
Born in Sharon, Connecticut, St. John engaged in mercantile pursuits and the real estate business at Monticello, New York, in 1831.
He was a member of the New York State Assembly (Sullivan County) in 1840.

St. John was elected as a Whig to the 30th United States Congress, holding office from March 4, 1847, to March 3, 1849.
He moved to Newburgh, New York.
He served as delegate to the Constitutional Union National Convention in 1860.

He was a member of the New York State Senate (10th D.) from 1876 to 1879, sitting in the 99th, 100th, 101st and 102nd New York State Legislatures, and a delegate to the 1876 Democratic National Convention.
St. John served as chief registrar in the banking department of New York State.
He died in New York City February 18, 1890.
He was interred in Cedar Hill Cemetery, Newburgh, New York.

Sources

1808 births
1890 deaths
New York (state) Democrats
New York (state) state senators
Members of the New York State Assembly
People from Monticello, New York
Politicians from Newburgh, New York
Whig Party members of the United States House of Representatives from New York (state)
19th-century American politicians